The North East Institute of Management Science (NEIMS) in Jorhat, India is a management school affiliated to Dibrugarh University.

Courses

Diploma 
DHM (Diploma in Hotel Management) 
DAHTM (Diploma in Airlines, Hospitality and Tourism Management)

Bachelor Degree 
BHMCT (Bachelor of Hotel Management and Catering Technology)
BBA (Bachelor Degree in Tourism Management)
B.Ed.(Bachelor of Education)
BTM (Bachelor of Tourism Management)

Master Degree 

MBA in Hotel Management
Master of Tourism Management (MTM)
Master of Social Work (MSW)

Facilities

Library
Career Counselling
Computer lab
Boys Hostels
Girls Hostel
Gymnasium
Playground

External

References

Universities and colleges in Assam
Education in Jorhat district
Dibrugarh University
Educational institutions established in 2000
2000 establishments in Assam